Matthew Steven Schulze (born July 3, 1972) is an American actor and musician. He is known for his role as Vince in The Fast and the Furious and Fast Five.

Early life
Schulze was born in St. Louis, Missouri. He grew up in St. Louis and has spent a good deal of time in the rough neighborhoods of East St. Louis. At age 16, he moved to Atlanta, where he had studied guitar at the prestigious Atlanta Institute of Music.

He moved back to St. Louis at age 17 and taught guitar for a year. He moved to Los Angeles in 1992 to be a studio musician, but ended up doing both modeling and acting.

Career
Schulze made his big screen debut in 1998's action film Blade, as the character Crease. He was also in an episode of Charmed, titled "Dream Sorcerer", in which he went into the dreams of women and killed them. In 1999, Schulze was cast in a leading role in Woody Keith's film Dementia (1999 film). His next film was the teen comedy Boys and Girls, where he had a small role as Paul. In 2001, he starred in Downward Angel. The same year he also appeared in The Fast and the Furious. Schulze returned in Blade II playing Bloodpack vampire assassin Chupa, and in the same year Schulze was cast as another villain in The Transporter. In 2004, he appeared in Torque.

Since then he has appeared in films including The Heart Is Deceitful Above All Things, Seven Mummies, and Final Move. He has also appeared in an episode of CSI: Miami and Law & Order: Special Victims Unit. He appeared in two films in 2007: The Flock and Mr. Brooks. In 2008, Schulze wrote, directed, and starred in the web series film The Acquirer (Episode 1). The film was shot on location in Paris, France, and was filmed entirely in high definition. Schulze stars opposite Tom Sizemore as Lucien, an international jewellery thief.
He returned for the fifth installment of the Fast & Furious franchise, Fast Five, reprising his role as Vince.

Filmography

Film

Television

References

External links

Living people
American male film actors
American male television actors
Male actors from St. Louis
20th-century American male actors
21st-century American male actors
Guitarists from Missouri
Musicians from St. Louis
20th-century American guitarists
21st-century American guitarists
1972 births